Frenchman Mountain is a mountain located east of Las Vegas, Nevada.  Made up of rocks similar to those found on the bottom of the Grand Canyon, Frenchman Mountain formed when faulting elevated and tilted the rocks followed by erosion, giving it its sharp triangular profile. The mountain provides an example of the Great Unconformity with the tilted Paleozoic Tapeats Sandstone underlain by Paleoproterozoic Vishnu Schist, which is some of the oldest rock on the North American continent, having been created about two billion years ago.

The peak lies on a north to north-northeast trending ridge about 2000 feet above the nearby valleys. The River Mountains lie to the southeast. State Route 147 crosses its northern slope. A geologically rich area called Rainbow Gardens is located to its southeast, as is an igneous laccolith, Lava Butte.
The Frenchman Mountain Fault poses a significant earthquake danger to the Clark County, Nevada (Las Vegas) region.

It is likely named after the "Frenchman Mine", which itself was alleged to be the site of a stock scam by a Belgian immigrant (mistakenly assumed to be French). It is commonly referred to as Sunrise Mountain, the name of a smaller peak to the north of Frenchman Mountain, because the sun rises over it in some areas of Las Vegas.  The area from Cheyenne Avenue and Boulder Highway and Lamb Boulevard is commonly known as Sunrise Manor Township CDP.

References

External links 

Rowland, S. (nda) Frenchman Mountain Great Unconformity site Department of Geoscience, University of Nevada, Las Vegas, Nevada.
Rowland, S. (ndb) Geologic Map of Frenchman Mountain Department of Geoscience, University of Nevada, Las Vegas, Nevada.
Rowland, S. (ndc) Frenchman Mountain and the Great Unconformity. Department of Geoscience, University of Nevada, Las Vegas, Nevada.
Share, J.  (2102a) The Great Unconformity of the Grand Canyon and the Late Proterozoic-Cambrian Time Interval: Part I - Defining It.
Share, J.  (2102a) The Great Unconformity and the Late Proterozoic-Cambrian Time Interval: Part II - The Rifting of Rodinia and the "Snowball Earth" Glaciations That Followed
Timmons, M. K. Karlstrom, and C. Dehler (1999) Grand Canyon Supergroup Six Unconformities Make One Great Unconformity A Record of Supercontinent Assembly and Disassembly. Boatman's Quarterly Review. vol. 12, no. 1, pp. 29–32.
 

Mountains of Nevada
Tourist attractions in the Las Vegas Valley
Mountains of Clark County, Nevada